Ozarka is a brand of spring water  which is bottled and sold in the South Central United States, including Arkansas, Texas, Oklahoma, Louisiana, New Mexico, Mississippi, and portions of Tennessee, Kansas and Missouri. The Ozarka Spring Water Company was founded in Eureka Springs, Arkansas in 1905, and was the town’s primary source of jobs and economic stability until it was bought and relocated away from Eureka Springs, leaving the town in economic turmoil. Ozarka is now a division of BlueTriton Brands. Ozarka's slogan is Born Better. The Ozarka water is selected from natural springs sources in Texas. It is found in Kroger, Walmart, and other retailers in Texas. It is no longer sourced from the Ozark mountain town of Eureka Springs, Arkansas, the mountain range from which it derived its name.

References

External links
 Official Ozarka Water

Bottled water brands
BlueTriton brands